Government of South Africa
Executive branch of the government of South Africa
Cabinets of South Africa
1961 establishments in South Africa
1968 disestablishments in South Africa
Cabinets established in 1961
Cabinets disestablished in 1968